Mileo Curtis Sesselmann (born 16 January, 1999) known by his stage name Mileo is a Norwegian, Australian singer, songwriter and recording artist of French and Norwegian descent.

Early life
Mileo was born in Sydney, Australia. His father was born in Oslo, Norway and his mother from Sydney, Australia.  He has stated that when he was younger he was different from most kids his age, having always been very ambitious. Mileo began singing at a young age, and taught himself piano. He began songwriting and later producing at a young age. Mileo attended a performing arts school where he was taught classical music, dance and acting, later graduating and studying at college.

Career

In early 2013, Mileo signed with Sony Music Entertainment after flying overseas to meet with his manager. Mileo released his debut single "Echo" on 11 February 2014, which was co-produced by a Norwegian producer Thomas Eriksen. NRJ officially premiered the single "Echo" to radio late February.

Since 2014, Mileo had been writing and recording material for his next single and studio album.
Late March 2016, he took to social media to announce his next single, titled Know You Better

Know You Better was released on 8 April 2016, the song went viral debuting on the Billboard "Spotify Viral 50" at number 16, and charting in the top 10 on multiple countries viral streaming charts, while reaching top position on the Hype Machine "Most Popular Tracks On Twitter".

Mid June, He later went on to announce his promotional single entitled "Boys Like Girls".
Released on 24 June 2016, Boys Like Girls Lyric video followed, arriving on YouTube for public viewing on 15 July.

Early 2017, Mileo left Sony to pen a deal with Universal, Mid March following the new signing Mileo posted a cryptic message to social media outlets, noting 17 March, he then began a countdown revealing everyday leading up to the release new information on his fourth single. 
Mileo announced the new single was titled Worry, revealing Norwegian/Spanish pop singer Adelén as a feature on the track.

On the 17th, Worry (feat. Adelén) was released to all digital retailers and streaming sites gaining heavy radio play across eastern Europe becoming Mileo's first national charting song.

Mileo followed up in 2018 with another promotional track titled "Him Or Me".

In 2019 on Halloween, Mileo released his single Dead, featuring the rap duo Madcon.

Artistry 
Mileo's style has been known to feature lyrics that contain a strong level of a casual, almost conversational tone, and a unique ability to make such blunt lyrics relatable.

His music contains strong influences of Pop music, Dance music and R&B. Known for his unique singing style and use of Melisma.

Personal life
Mileo has been quoted to be pro LGBT, he also performed at Sydney's Mardi Gras festival in 2022 with previous collaborator Wasteland.
According to an interview with radio station NRK MP3, Mileo knows how to speak a little Norwegian and French.

Discography
 Echo (2014)
 Know You Better (2016)
 Boys Like Girls  (2016) (Promotional)
 Worry (2017)
 Him Or Me  (2018) (Promotional)
 Dessert (2018)
 Dead (feat. Madcon) (2019)
 Isolate (2020) (Promotional)

References

External links
 

Australian people of English descent
Australian people of Norwegian descent
Australian pop singers
Living people
Musicians from Sydney
21st-century Australian singers
Australian dance musicians
21st-century Australian male singers
Year of birth missing (living people)